Maksym Serhiyovich Krypak (born 23 May 1995 in Kharkiv) is a Paralympic swimmer from Ukraine who competes in S10 and SM10 (individual medley) events. He won five gold and three silver medals at the 2016 Rio Paralympics, setting new world records in the 100 m backstroke and 400 m freestyle.

Krypak won seven medals at the 2020 Paralympic Games and became the most titled athlete of these games.

On 17 September 2021 President Volodymyr Zelensky awarded Krypak the title of Hero of Ukraine.

References

External links

 
 

1995 births
Living people
Ukrainian male freestyle swimmers
Ukrainian male butterfly swimmers
S10-classified Paralympic swimmers
Paralympic swimmers of Ukraine
Paralympic gold medalists for Ukraine
Paralympic silver medalists for Ukraine
Paralympic medalists in swimming
Swimmers at the 2016 Summer Paralympics
Swimmers at the 2020 Summer Paralympics
Medalists at the 2016 Summer Paralympics
Medalists at the 2020 Summer Paralympics
Medalists at the World Para Swimming Championships
Medalists at the World Para Swimming European Championships
Recipients of the title of Hero of Ukraine
Kharkiv State College of Physical Culture 1 alumni
Sportspeople from Kharkiv
21st-century Ukrainian people